Yitu Yulüdi, born Xuan, was the son of Yifa Yulüdi. He succeeded Huxie Shizhu Houdi in 85 AD and ruled until his death in 88 AD. He was succeeded by his cousin Tuntuhe.

Upon coming to power in 85 AD, Yitu attacked the Northern Xiongnu and slew one of their kings. The Southern Xiongnu continued raiding Northern Xiongnu trade caravans.

Emperor Zhang of Han ordered the Southern Xiongnu to ransom northern prisoners to appease the Northern Xiongnu. This only strengthened the southern position as it rewarded them for their aggression.

In 88 AD, Yitu died and was succeeded by his cousin Tuntuhe.

Footnotes

References

Bichurin N.Ya., "Collection of information on peoples in Central Asia in ancient times", vol. 1, Sankt Petersburg, 1851, reprint Moscow-Leningrad, 1950

Taskin B.S., "Materials on Sünnu history", Science, Moscow, 1968, p. 31 (In Russian)

Chanyus